Country Women was an American feminist magazine published in Albion, California from 1972 until 1979. Describing itself as "a feminist country survival manual and a creative journal," the magazine published various articles, poems, and illustrations concerning women learning and growing in rural communities. Country Women was founded, hand-illustrated, and typewritten by Carmen Goodyear and a commune of women she had welcomed to her property after moving to Mendocino County.

The magazine advertised itself in HERESIES, another feminist publication, by describing its content:

Country Women was successful for a while, garnering more subscribers than Ms. magazine at one point, but ultimately ceased publication in 1979 due to financial and staff issues.

References 

Feminist magazines
Magazines established in 1972
Magazines disestablished in 1979
Magazines published in California
Women's magazines published in the United States